Iván Santos Martinez (born 18 February 1982, in Puebla de Lillo) is a former Spanish racing cyclist.

Palmarès
2003
1st Stage 1 Vuelta a Extremadura (TTT)
2004
1st Vuelta al Bidasoa
1st Stage 2

References

1982 births
Living people
Spanish male cyclists
Sportspeople from the Province of León
Cyclists from Castile and León